David Pisot (born 6 July 1987) is a German professional footballer who plays as a centre-back for Regionalliga Bayern club SpVgg Unterhaching.

Club career
In October 2007 he was promoted to the first team of VfB Stuttgart. He had his professional debut on 20 October 2007 against Hamburger SV.

On 24 January 2008, Pisot was loaned out to SC Paderborn 07 until the end of the season. In July 2008 he returned to the second team of VfB Stuttgart. On 29 May 2009, he signed a contract with FC Ingolstadt 04 and joined his new club on 1 July 2009.

International career
Pisot was born in Germany to an African-American father and German mother, and adopted by his nurses. Pisot is a youth international for Germany at the U19 level.

References

External links
 
 

Living people
1987 births
Footballers from Karlsruhe
Association football defenders
German footballers
Germany youth international footballers
German people of American descent
German people of African-American descent
VfB Stuttgart players
VfB Stuttgart II players
SC Paderborn 07 players
FC Ingolstadt 04 players
VfL Osnabrück players
Würzburger Kickers players
Karlsruher SC players
SpVgg Unterhaching players
Bundesliga players
2. Bundesliga players
3. Liga players
Regionalliga players